Tullgrenella is a genus of South American jumping spiders that was first described by Cândido Firmino de Mello-Leitão in 1941. It is named after Swedish arachnologist Albert Tullgren, and is a senior synonym of Akeloides.

Species
 it contains thirteen species, found in Uruguay, Chile, Argentina, Bolivia, and Brazil:
Tullgrenella corrugata Galiano, 1981 – Brazil
Tullgrenella didelphis (Simon, 1886) – Bolivia
Tullgrenella gertschi Galiano, 1981 – Brazil
Tullgrenella guayapae Galiano, 1970 – Argentina
Tullgrenella lunata (Mello-Leitão, 1944) – Argentina
Tullgrenella melanica (Mello-Leitão, 1941) – Argentina
Tullgrenella morenensis (Tullgren, 1905) (type) – Argentina
Tullgrenella musica (Mello-Leitão, 1945) – Argentina
Tullgrenella peniaflorensis Galiano, 1970 – Chile
Tullgrenella quadripunctata (Mello-Leitão, 1944) – Argentina, Uruguay
Tullgrenella selenita Galiano, 1970 – Argentina
Tullgrenella serrana Galiano, 1970 – Argentina
Tullgrenella yungae Galiano, 1970 – Bolivia, Argentina

References

External links
 Photographs of Tullgrenella species from Brazil (Corythalia?)

Salticidae
Salticidae genera
Spiders of South America
Taxa named by Cândido Firmino de Mello-Leitão